Abid Ali is a masculine given name and surname. It may refer to:
 Abid Ali (actor) (1952–2019), Pakistani television actor
 Abid Ali (Pakistani cricketer) (born 1987), Pakistani international cricketer
 Abid Ali Abid (1906–1971), Urdu and Persian critic, poet, principal of Dyal Singh College
 Abid Ali Akbar, Pakistani tennis player
 Abid Ali Jaferbhai (1899–1973), Indian Union Deputy Minister and Indian National Congress leader
 Abid Ali Kazi, cricket statistician and historian based in Pakistan
 Abid Ali (Indian National Army), captain in the Indian National Army
 Syed Abid Ali (born 1941), all-rounder Indian cricketer
 Ahmad Abid Ali (born 1986), Iraqi football midfielder
 Nashat Akram (Nashat Akram Abid Ali, (born 1984), Iraqi football midfielder

See also
 Abid (name)
 Ali (name)

Arabic masculine given names